Captain Eric John Stephens (1895-1967) was an Australian flying ace who served in the Royal Air Force. He was credited with 13 confirmed aerial victories. He later became a Qantas pilot.

Early life
Eric John Stephens was born in Bendigo, Victoria, Australia on 13 September 1895. When Eric John Stephens joined the Australian Imperial Force on 19 July 1915, he named his father, John Thomas Stephens, as next of kin. The younger Stephens was a college student and was in the militia when he joined.

He landed at Marseilles, France in June 1916. He served on both the Northern Front and the Somme River, being commissioned a Second Lieutenant in the process.

Flying service
Stephens' was commissioned in the RFC on 13 April 1917. He became a pilot on 30 June. He was retained as a flying instructor until his transfer to No. 41 Squadron RFC on 16 March 1918. Using a Royal Aircraft Factory SE.5a, he shot down a Rumpler on 28 June for his first victory; he shared it with Frederick McCall. Stephens would accumulate 12 more wins after this, all solo, and most over enemy fighters, with the final one falling on 1 November 1918. By war's end, he was a Flight Commander, had destroyed five enemy airplanes, and driven down eight more out of control.

Aerial victory list

Post World War I
Stephens earned the Distinguished Flying Cross, which was gazetted to him on 3 June 1919. He was transferred to the RAF's unemployed list on 16 August 1919. He went on to fly for Qantas in the 1930s.

Endnotes

References
 Above the Trenches: A Complete Record of the Fighter Aces and Units of the British Empire Air Forces 1915-1920. Christopher F. Shores, Norman L. R. Franks, Russell Guest. Grub Street, 1990. , .

1895 births
1967 deaths
Australian World War I flying aces